"I'm Alive" is a song by British musician Seal, released in 1995 as the fourth single from his second studio album Seal (aka Seal II) (1994).

Critical reception
Fell and Rufer from the Gavin Report wrote in their review of "I'm Alive", "As with his previous singles it's fresh, inventive and moody without losing touch with pop music's core. Provacative pop to be sure."

Track listing

Charts

References

1994 singles
Seal (musician) songs
Songs written by Seal (musician)
Song recordings produced by Trevor Horn
1994 songs
ZTT Records singles